Natal is the name of several ships:

 , a  launched on 30 September 1905 and sunk by an internal explosion in the Cromarty Firth on 30 December 1915.
She was converted to a survey ship in 1957 and decommissioned and sunk as a target off the Cape of Good Hope in 1972.

See also
 
 
 
 
 Natal (disambiguation)

Ship names